Brian Keith Bosworth (born March 9, 1965), nicknamed "The Boz," is an American former football linebacker and actor who played in the National Football League (NFL) for three seasons with the Seattle Seahawks. A two-time Dick Butkus Award winner during his college football career at Oklahoma, he also achieved notoriety for his outspoken comments and antics. Bosworth was selected by the Seahawks in the first round of the 1987 NFL supplemental draft, but his professional career would be cut short by injury. After retiring as a player, Bosworth pursued an acting career. He was inducted to the College Football Hall of Fame in 2015.

Early life
Brian Bosworth was born in Oklahoma City, Oklahoma. He attended Macarthur High School in Irving, Texas, where he was a two-time consensus All-American for the football team. He graduated in 1983. He was recruited to play football for the University of Oklahoma.

College career
Bosworth played linebacker for the Oklahoma Sooners for three seasons, from 1984 to 1986. He was recognized as a consensus first-team All-American in both his sophomore and junior years.

Bosworth was barred from playing in the Orange Bowl following his junior year after he tested positive for steroids. He claimed that his use of steroids was medically prescribed by his doctor because of his injuries.

A strong-side inside linebacker throughout his college career, Bosworth was known for raising his level of play in big games. He was regarded as a great tackler, although he was occasionally criticized for tackling too high. The winner of the first two Butkus Awards as the nation's top college linebacker, he remains the only player ever to have won the accolade more than once. College Football News ranked him No. 30 on its list of the "100 Greatest College Players of All-Time". In October 1999, Bosworth was named to the Sports Illustrated NCAA Football All-Century Team as one of only nine linebackers on the squad.

College controversies
Known for his radical hairstyles and criticism of the NCAA as much as his on-field play, Bosworth embraced publicity and controversy. He was particularly focused on the level of control the NCAA exerted over athletes, preventing them from making money during their college careers.

Because of the steroid suspension, Bosworth was not allowed to play in the post-season 1987 Orange Bowl. During the 3rd quarter of that game, Bosworth pulled off his football jersey to reveal a t-shirt that read, "NCAA: National Communists Against Athletes". Immediately picked up by the television cameras, this led to much consternation among alumni and administrators at Oklahoma. Aware that Bosworth was likely to be entering the NFL Draft anyway, the OU coach, Barry Switzer, dismissed Bosworth from the team.

Bosworth was quoted in Sports Illustrated magazine's 1986 fall football issue as saying that at a summer job at GM's Oklahoma City plant, co-workers taught him how to insert the bolts in hard-to-reach places so they would rattle. He told the magazine, "If you own a Celebrity or Century made in 1985 in Oklahoma City, that car is (messed up) if I had anything to do with it". In addition, he claimed that each bolt carried a note that said: "Aha! You found me!" and said, "I love the thought of people going absolutely crazy, saying "Where is that ... rattle coming from?"' Some of Bosworth's former co-workers who read the story wrote letters to Bosworth and to university officials at the Norman campus. Bosworth reportedly retracted the statement, although he later denied the retraction.

In September 1988, Bosworth wrote an autobiography, The Boz, with Sports Illustrated's Rick Reilly. In it, Bosworth said the Sooner football program was laden with drug use, gun play in the athletic dorm, and other wild behavior. Although many Sooner boosters dismissed it as the rantings of a resentful ex-player, an NCAA report issued three months later confirmed many of Bosworth's claims, and ultimately led to Switzer being forced to resign.

NFL Draft
Bosworth planned his college coursework so that he could graduate a year early, which would allow him the option to enter the NFL Draft a year early. In addition, it would give him some leverage over which team drafted him. Knowing he could go back to Oklahoma if he did not get chosen by a preferred NFL team, Bosworth sent letters to various NFL teams stating that, if they drafted him, he wouldn't report to their training camp and he wouldn't play for them. As a joke, the Tacoma Stars of the Major Indoor Soccer League selected him in the 12th round in their 1987 draft, as their general manager stated, "Because we didn't receive a letter from him that he wouldn't play for us." At one point, Bosworth was interviewed by Bryant Gumbel  on The Today Show and declared his desire to play for the Los Angeles Raiders saying they best fit his personality.

By getting dismissed from the football team after the Orange Bowl t-shirt incident, Bosworth lost his leverage in trying to control where he would play.

Professional career
Bosworth was drafted by the Seattle Seahawks, one of the teams to whom he had sent a letter of disinterest, in the 1987 NFL supplemental draft in June. After initially declaring he would stick to his promise that he would not sign, he signed both the biggest contract in team history and the biggest rookie contract in NFL history at the time: ten years for $11 million. After being drafted, Bosworth sued the NFL for the right to wear number 44 (the number he wore in college) and the Seahawks petitioned for a rules change, due to an NFL rule against linebackers wearing jerseys in the 40s, but were unsuccessful. Bosworth ultimately chose to wear number 55. In 2015, long after Bosworth retired, the NFL changed its rules to allow linebackers to wear jerseys in the 40s.

Bosworth signed with a Seahawks team that had failed to reach the playoffs for two seasons (a 10-6 finish in 1986 was only good enough for 3rd in theAFC West as they lost to the Kansas City Chiefs in head-to-head matchup). He appeared in 12 games in his rookie season, playing well for the most part, but became known more for his outspoken personality and appearance than his actual play on the field. Before the first game of the season, versus the Denver Broncos, Bosworth trash talked Denver quarterback John Elway. At the game, 10,000 Denver fans wore $15 T-shirts reading "What's a Boz Worth? Nothing", but they did not know that Bosworth's company manufactured the shirts. Later that season, prior to the Seahawks' second matchup with the Los Angeles Raiders, Bosworth publicly claimed that he was going to "contain" Raiders running back Bo Jackson. During a red zone play, Jackson received a hand-off and powered through Bosworth's attempted tackle to score a touchdown. According to Jackson, when he and Bosworth got to their feet after the play was over, he told Bosworth, "Next time, make sure you have a bus fare," infuriating Bosworth. The Raiders went on to win that game, 37–14, thanks in part to Jackson's 3 touchdowns and 221 rushing yards.

Injury
Bosworth was forced to retire after only two seasons in 1989, having suffered a shoulder injury in the 1988 season. Team Doctor Pierce E. Scranton Jr. explained that, "Brian was a twenty-five-year-old with the shoulders of a sixty-year-old. He flunked my physical." In 1993 Bosworth prevailed in a $7M lawsuit against Lloyd's of London. Lloyd's position was that Bosworth's shoulder was injured as a result of degenerative arthritis which was not covered in his policy. Bosworth maintained his injury was sustained during a single hit.

Legacy

On January 9, 2015, Bosworth was announced as one of the inductees to the College Football Hall of Fame class of 2015.

Bosworth was named the sixth worst flop on the Biggest Flops of the Last 25 Years list by ESPN in July 2004.

Commentator and acting career
Following the end of his football career, Bosworth decided to pursue a career as an actor. He starred in the 1991 action film Stone Cold and has had an on-again/off-again film career starring in several low budget titles such as One Man's Justice that went straight to DVD. In 2005, he had a role as one of the prison-guard football players in the Adam Sandler movie remake The Longest Yard. He also starred in Lawless, a television series for Fox that was cancelled immediately after its premiere.

In 2001, Bosworth joined the XFL as a color commentator for its television broadcasts. He was assigned to the crew which called games that aired Sunday nights on UPN, which consisted of Chris Marlowe on play-by-play and Chris Wragge and Michael Barkann as the sideline reporters.

Two years later, Bosworth was hired by Turner Sports as a college football studio analyst. Bosworth worked on TBS' Saturday night game coverage, contributing to pregame, halftime, and postgame coverage alongside studio host Ernie Johnson. He left the position after the 2003 season.

Bosworth has been a guest on numerous episodes of Chopped as a judge.

He appeared on episode 1, in the 2010 season of Hell's Kitchen as a dining guest.

In August 2014, Bosworth appeared in a Dish Network commercial with fellow former players Matt Leinart and Heath Shuler, depicting them pining for a chance to return to their more successful college days.

Bosworth appeared with Bo Jackson in a Tecmo Bowl-style television advertisement for the Kia Sorento in 2016, which parodied Jackson running through him in their 1987 game.

Bosworth has appeared as the sheriff in the "Fansville" series of Dr Pepper commercials since 2018.

Personal life
Bosworth married his high school girlfriend, Katherine Nicastro, in September 1993. The couple had three children before divorcing in 2006. He also has two nephews who played football for the UCLA Bruins. They both were signed as undrafted free agents, one by the Jacksonville Jaguars and one by the Detroit Lions. In 2010, Bosworth became a real estate agent for Sotheby's International Realty in their Malibu, California brokerage office.

On July 5, 2008, Bosworth assisted with the rescue of a woman who rolled her SUV east of Winnipeg, Manitoba. In 2009, he administered CPR to a fallen man in a parking lot until medical help arrived.

Brian and the Boz
In 2014, Bosworth was the subject of a documentary by Thaddeus D. Matula. The film, titled Brian and The Boz, premiered on October 28, 2014, as part of the ESPN 30 for 30 series and chronicled Bosworth's rise and fall as an athlete. The title of the film refers to an internal conflict Bosworth discusses during the film at length, which got to the point where the image he created for himself as "The Boz" took control of his life.

Much of the film focuses on a trip that Bosworth takes with his son Max to a storage facility in Austin, Texas, where Bosworth had rented a locker and filled it with personal belongings from his football career that he had discovered were sitting around his mother's attic. Special attention is paid to the T-shirt that got Bosworth kicked off the Oklahoma football team, as well as his recruiting letters and a scrapbook kept by his father Foster, which consisted of dozens and dozens of newspaper clippings focusing on his son's games. While going through what was in the locker, the two men reminisce about the past and Bosworth's fractured relationship with his father, whom Bosworth knew was proud of his accomplishments but also was extremely hard on him and, according to Bosworth, never seemed to be happy with what he did.

Among the other participants in the film were Barry Switzer, whom Bosworth still considers a father figure; several of Bosworth's teammates including Tony Casillas, who is particularly critical of Bosworth's autobiography; Rick Reilly, who co-wrote The Boz with Bosworth; and several close friends and family members of Bosworth including his childhood friend John DiPasquale, his daughter Hayley Bosworth, who followed in her father's footsteps and became a student-athlete at Oklahoma by joining the volleyball team, and Sooners fan and close friend Jim Ross.

Acting filmography

References

External links
 
 
 

1965 births
All-American college football players
American color commentators
American football middle linebackers
American male film actors
College Football Hall of Fame inductees
Living people
Oklahoma Sooners football players
People from Irving, Texas
Players of American football from Texas
Seattle Seahawks players
Sportspeople from Oklahoma City
Sportspeople from the Dallas–Fort Worth metroplex
XFL (2001) announcers